Phyllonorycter argentifrontella is a moth of the family Gracillariidae. It is known from Saint Thomas, U.S. Virgin Islands.

References

argentifrontella
Moths of North America
Moths described in 1897